Newnan is a city in Metro Atlanta and the county seat of Coweta County, Georgia, about  southwest of Atlanta. Its population was 42,549 at the 2020 census, up from 33,039 in 2010.

History

Newnan was established as county seat of Coweta County (replacing the defunct town of Bullsboro) in 1828, and was named for North Carolinian General Daniel Newnan. It quickly became a prosperous magnet for lawyers, doctors, other professionals, and merchants. Much of Newnan's prosperity was due to its thriving cotton industry, which relied on slavery.

Newnan was largely untouched by the Civil War due to its status as a hospital city (for both Union and Confederate troops), and as a result still features much antebellum architecture. Celebrated architect Kennon Perry designed many of the town's 20th-century homes. During the Atlanta Campaign, Confederate cavalry defeated Union forces at the nearby Battle of Brown's Mill.

On April 23, 1899, a notorious lynching occurred after an African-American man by the name of Sam Hose (born Tom Wilkes) was accused of killing his boss, Alfred Cranford. Hose was abducted from police custody, paraded through Newnan, tortured, and burned alive just north of town by a lynch mob of roughly 2,000 citizens of Coweta County.

Newnan was also host to the trial in 1948 of wealthy landowner John Wallace, the first White man in the South to be condemned to death by the testimony of African Americans, two field hands who were made to help with burning the body of murdered white sharecropper Wilson Turner. These events were portrayed in the novel Murder in Coweta County. The film version starred Johnny Cash, Andy Griffith, and June Carter.

In 1968, Kmart opened a warehouse in Newnan, which slowly established it as a major hub for distribution in the area. Around this time, the International Brotherhood of Teamsters attempted to unionize the warehouse, but the attempt was defeated when the employees voted 329 to 201 in favor of remaining union-free.  In 2015, the distribution center closed with a loss of 164 jobs.

2021 tornado

In the early morning hours of March 26, 2021, Newnan was directly impacted by a violent EF4 tornado, which caused substantial structural damage and indirectly killed one person. The tornado was one of the strongest on record in Georgia since 1950, and directly impacted the historic downtown area.  Newnan High School will be re-built after sustaining serious damage.

Arts and culture

The city is home to one of the few Georgia counties with a museum that focuses mainly on African-American history. The Coweta County African American Heritage Museum and Research Center, or Caswell House, was opened in July 2003 in a donated mill village house once owned by Ruby Caswell. The museum sits on Farmer Street on an old, unmarked slave cemetery. It has collected hundreds of family genealogical records by interviewing residents and going through the census records. The museum also houses the Coweta Census Indexes from 1870 to 1920.

The first Black library in the county was the Sara Fisher Brown Library. Built in the 1950s, the library has since been converted into the Community Action For Improvement Center.

The Farmer Street Cemetery is the largest slave cemetery in the South, and may be the largest undisturbed one in the nation. It is within the city limits of Newnan.

Geography 
Newnan is located in the center of Coweta County at  (33.376411, -84.788648). U.S. Route 29 passes through the center of the city, leading northeast  to Palmetto and south  to Moreland. Interstate 85 passes through the eastern side of the city, with access from exits 41, 44, and 47. I-85 leads northeast  to downtown Atlanta and southwest  to Montgomery, Alabama. U.S. Route 27A leads northwest from the center of Newnan  to Carrollton.

Climate 
The climate is moderate with an average temperature of 64.3°F (45.8° in the winter and 79.1° in the summer). The average annual rainfall is 51.84 inches.

Transportation

Major roads
Interstate 85
Outer Perimeter
State Route 34
State Route 34 Bypass
State Route 16
State Route 70
Lower Fayetteville Road
Newnan Crossing Boulevard East
Newnan Crossing Bypass
U.S. Route 29
U.S. Route 27 Alternate

Pedestrians and cycling
LINC

Airports
Newnan–Coweta County Airport provides chartered air service and flight training.

Railroads
Until the mid-1950s the Central of Georgia operated two trains daily in each direction, through Newnan from Atlanta to Columbus, in its Man O' War service. The Central continued a single Man O' War train until 1971 when Amtrak took over most interstate passenger service. Until 1970, the city was a stop on the Southern Railway's Crescent from New Orleans to New York City, via Atlanta. Into the mid-1960s, the Southern's Crescent and Piedmont Limited made stops in both directions in Newnan.

Demographics

2020 census

As of the 2020 United States census, there were 42,549 people, 15,135 households, and 10,013 families residing in the city.

2010 census
As of 2010, Newnan's population was approximately 33,039 and Coweta County's population was approximately 127,400. From 2000 to 2010, the population of Coweta County grew by 42.7% as compared to from 1990 to 2000, when its population grew by 65.7%. Newnan's population grew by 30% from 1990 to 2000 and by 103.4% from 2000 to 2010.

The ethnic makeup of the city was 50.8% White, 37.6% African American, 0.3% Native American, 2.8% Asian, 0.1% Pacific Islander, 5.6% from some other race, and 2.8% from two or more races. Hispanics or Latinos of any race were 11.4% of the population.

Of the 13,783 households,  34.4% had children under 18 living with them, 42.5% were married couples living together, 17.7% had a female householder with no husband present, and 33.4% were not families. About 28.6% of all households were made up of individuals, and 7.3% had someone living alone who was 65  or older. The average household size was 2.61, and the average family size was 3.17.
In the city, the age distribution was 30.8% under 18, 7.8% from 18 to 24, 29.8% from 25 to 44, 21.9% from 45 to 64, and 9.8% who were 65 or older. The median age was 33.3 years.

The median income for a household in the city was $50,175 and for a family was $64,615. Males had a median income of $50,753 versus $39,691 for females. The per capita income for the city was $19,081. About 17.3% of families and 22.0% of the population were below the poverty line, including 32.0% of those under age 18 and 5.7% of those age 65 or over.

Education

Coweta County School District 
The Coweta County School District holds preschool to grade 12, and consists of 19 elementary schools, seven middle schools, and three high schools. The district has 1,164 full-time teachers and over 18,389 students.

Elementary schools 
 Arbor Springs Elementary
 Arnco-Sargent Elementary
 Atkinson Elementary
 Brooks Elementary
 Canongate Elementary
 Eastside Elementary
 Elm Street Elementary
 Grantville Elementary
 Jefferson Parkway Elementary
 Moreland Elementary
 Newnan Crossing Elementary
 Northside Elementary
 Poplar Road Elementary
 Ruth Hill Elementary
 Thomas Crossroads Elementary
 Western Elementary
 Welch Elementary
 White Oak Elementary
 Willis Road Elementary
The Heritage School (private)
Trinity Christian School (private)

Middle schools 
 Arnall Middle School
 Blake Bass Middle School
 East Coweta Middle School
 Evans Middle School
 Lee Middle School
 Madras Middle School
 Smokey Road Middle School
 The Heritage School (private)
Trinity Christian School (private)
 Odyssey Charter School

High schools 
Newnan High School
East Coweta High School
Northgate High School
Central Educational Center (Chartered Coweta County School System School)
The Pentecostal Church of God Christian Academy (private)
The Heritage School (private)
Trinity Christian School (private)

Higher education
Mercer University has a regional academic center in Newnan. The center opened in 2010, and offers programs through the university's College of Continuing and Professional Studies.

The University of West Georgia has a campus located in Newnan, near downtown. This campus currently has two undergraduate programs - bachelor of science in nursing and early childhood education.

Newnan is also home to a campus of West Georgia Technical College.

College Temple, a non-sectarian women's school, operated during the period of 1854-1888.

Notable people
Ellis Arnall, governor of Georgia (1943–1947)
William Yates Atkinson, governor of Georgia (1894–1898)
Karsten Bailey, former National Football League (NFL) wide receiver with Seattle Seahawks and Green Bay Packers
Enoch Marvin Banks, historian and educator
Cam Bedrosian, Major League Baseball (MLB) pitcher for the Los Angeles Angels
Steve Bedrosian, former MLB pitcher, winner of 1987 Cy Young Award
Hamilton Bohannon, musician and record producer
Keith Brooking, former linebacker with Georgia Tech and NFL's Atlanta Falcons and Dallas Cowboys
Erskine Caldwell, novelist and short fiction writer (1903–1987)
Jack Tarpley Camp Jr., jurist
Lewis Grizzard, author and newspaper columnist
Drew Hill, former NFL wide receiver with Houston Oilers, Los Angeles Rams, and Atlanta Falcons
Alan Jackson, Country Music Hall of Fame member
Joe M. Jackson, United States Air Force colonel, Medal of Honor recipient
Calvin Johnson, former All-Pro NFL wide receiver with Detroit Lions, second selection of 2007 NFL Draft
John Keith, former NFL player
Wil Lutz, NFL kicker with New Orleans Saints
Mary Lyndon, first woman to receive degree from University of Georgia
Monica, Grammy-winning singer, songwriter, actress, and entrepreneur
Warren Newson, MLB player with Chicago White Sox, Texas Rangers
Alec Ogletree, NFL linebacker
Stephen W. Pless, Marine Corps major, Medal of Honor recipient
Ralph Presley, airline pilot and politician
Rocky Roquemore, international golf course designer
Jefferson Randolph "Soapy" Smith II, (1860–1898), infamous 19th century gambler, confidence man, and crime boss
 Lynn Smith, businesswoman, educator, and politician
Will Smith, MLB pitcher for the Houston Astros
Doug Stone, country music singer-songwriter
Jerome Walton, MLB player, 1989 Rookie of the Year
Marie Robinson Wright (1853–1914), journalist, traveler, historian, author
William C. Wright, congressman (1918–1933)
Steve Young, pioneer country rock musician

Television and movies
 The ABC television series October Road was filmed in Newnan, but is set in the fictional town of Knights Ridge, Massachusetts.
The TV movie Murder in Coweta County (1983), based on the book by Margaret Anne Barnes, chronicles actual events that occurred around 1948.
 The NBC series I'll Fly Away was filmed in Newnan from 1991 to 1993.
 The 1995 movie Fluke was filmed in Newnan.
 Pet Sematary Two (1992)
 The 1979 movie The Sheriff and the Satellite Kid (Uno sceriffo extraterrestre... poco extra e molto terrestre) with Bud Spencer takes place and was filmed in Newnan.
 The Walking Dead TV series has several scenes filmed in Newnan, including Newnan High School and Sonrise Baptist Church.
The Netflix TV series Insatiable was filmed in Newnan.
Zombieland (2009)
The Hunger Games: Mockingjay – Part 1 (2014)
The Founder (2016)
The House with a Clock in Its Walls (2018)
Lovecraft Country (2019)

References

External links
City of Newnan official website

Cities in Georgia (U.S. state)
Cities in Coweta County, Georgia
County seats in Georgia (U.S. state)
1828 establishments in Georgia (U.S. state)